Adam Darius (10 May 1930 – 3 December 2017) was a Turkish origin American dancer, mime artist, writer and choreographer. As a performer, he appeared in over 86 countries across six continents. As a writer, he published 19 books and wrote 22 plays.

In a program devoted to his career, the BBC World Service described him as "one of the most exceptional talents of the 20th century".

Biography
Adam Darius was born in Manhattan, New York City, into a family of Turkish and Russian ancestry.

Ballet career

Adam Darius began his ballet and contemporary dance training in 1945, at the age of 14, and went on to study with, among others, Anatole Oboukhov, George Goncharov, Olga Preobrajenska and José Limón.

His professional career began in 1946 with appearances at New York's Metropolitan Opera House, and then with numerous ballet companies including Britain's International Ballet (1953), Canada's Royal Winnipeg Ballet (1954), and Denmark's Scandinavian Ballet (1962). He was also choreographer of the Israel National Opera (1963–1964), where he choreographed four operas for opera star Plácido Domingo; (Don Giovanni, Carmen, La Traviata and The Pearl Fishers, all of which premièred at the Israel National Opera in Tel-Aviv in 1963). From 1964–1966, Adam Darius was the director of his own company, the Israeli Ballet.

Principal ballets:
Pierrot the Wanderer - Choreographed for American prima ballerina Melissa Hayden and premièred at the Canadian Broadcasting Corporation (CBC) in Toronto, Canada in 1955.
Quartet - Choreographed for American prima ballerina Cynthia Gregory and premièred at the San Gabriel Mission Playhouse, California in 1958.
The Anne Frank Ballet - Premièred in Long Beach, California in 1959. Produced for Italian Television in 1967. Released as a video in 1989, in which Mr Darius danced the role of Anne Frank's father, Otto Frank.
Marilyn - A ballet based on the life of Marilyn Monroe, which ran for five weeks at the Arts Theatre in London's West End in February 1975.
Firebird - Choreographed to Stravinsky's music. Presented by the Las Vegas Civic Ballet at the Reed Whipple Cultural Center, Las Vegas, in April 1986.

Expressive mime

In 1967, Adam Darius broke away from the traditional world of ballet and premièred his own fusion of dance and mime, described as 'expressive mime', at the Spoleto Festival in Italy and at the Arts Lab in London.

In the years that followed he toured many countries, including: South Africa (1970); the Soviet Union (1971); the Philippines, Papua New Guinea and Australia (1971); Syria, Iran and Afghanistan (1976); Japan (1984); and Greenland (1998).

Adam Darius' concept of physical theatre was also realized in the London productions of Yukio Mishima (1991), Rimbaud and Verlaine (1992) and Tower of Babel (1993), in collaboration with Kazimir Kolesnik. Among their further joint productions was A Snake in the Grass, presented in Amman, Jordan (2001) and acknowledged with the Noor Al Hussein Award.

Teaching
In 1978, Adam Darius and Marita Crawley founded the Mime Centre in London. In Britain he taught, among others, mime artist, dancer and director, Kazimir Kolesnik, rock star Kate Bush, Hollywood film star Kate Beckinsale, and West End principal Warren Mitchell.

Death
Darius died on 3 December 2017 in Espoo, Finland at the age of 87.

Books by Adam Darius

Honours and awards

 1976: Silver medallion of the Belgrade Monodrama Festival (Yugoslavia)
 1976: Honorary membership of the North Sumatran Community (Indonesia)
 1978: American Television Emmy (US)
 1984: Premio Positano Léonide Massine Per L'arte Della Danza (Italy)
 1987: Key to the City of Las Vegas (US)
 1998: Shetland Dance and Mime Award (UK)
 2001: Noor Al Hussein Foundation Award (Jordan)
 2002: Beirut Festival du Rire Trophy (Lebanon)
 2003: Noor Al Hussein Foundation Award (Jordan)
 2009: Order of Luis Manuel Gutiérrez (Venezuela)
 2012: Ministerio del Poder Popular para la Cultura Award (Venezuela)
 2014: Gjakova Komedia Fest Appreciation Award (Republic of Kosovo)
 2016: Simon Bolívar Award (Venezuela)

International performances since January 2000
Unless marked as being a SOLO performance, all shows were given in partnership with Kazimir Kolesnik.

Notes

External links 
Adam Darius at the mimecentre.com
Adam Darius on Facebook
Dansmuseet, Stockholm, Sweden

1930 births
2017 deaths
American male ballet dancers
American mimes
American people of Russian descent
American people of Turkish descent
Ballet choreographers
Dance writers
20th-century American novelists
Emmy Award winners
People from Manhattan
American autobiographers
21st-century American novelists
20th-century American dramatists and playwrights
American male novelists
American male dramatists and playwrights
20th-century American male writers
21st-century American male writers
Novelists from New York (state)
20th-century American non-fiction writers
21st-century American non-fiction writers
American male non-fiction writers
20th-century American ballet dancers